The 2010–11 TT Pro League season (known as the Digicel Pro League for sponsorship reasons) was the twelfth season of the TT Pro League, the Trinidad and Tobago professional league for association football clubs, since its establishment in 1999. A total of eleven teams contested the league, with Joe Public the defending champions. The season began on 23 April 2010 and ended on 1 February 2011 with the crowning of the league champion. The league calendar was changed for the second consecutive season. Pro League CEO, Dexter Skeene, announced on 25 March 2010 that the Pro League Big Six competition was to be discontinued to increase attendances and importance of league matches, which would be moved exclusively to Fridays and Saturdays.

United Petrotrin withdrew stating financial difficulties as the reason to pull out of the Pro League. A dedication to the club's youth development in the community was also cited by club chairman and communications manager of Petrotrin, Arnold Corneal, on 12 January 2010. However, on 18 February, North East Stars were re-admitted into the Pro League following a one- year absence due to the state of their home ground, Sangre Grande Recreational Ground.

The first goal of the season was scored by W Connection's Matthew Bartholomew against San Juan Jabloteh in the sixty-third minute of the first game on 23 April 2010. Odelle Armstrong of St. Ann's Rangers scored the first hat-trick of the season against Police on 29 May. Devorn Jorsling became the first player to win the Golden Boot twice having scored 15 goals for Defence Force on their way to becoming league champions. Jorsling previously won the award in 2008.

The season was delayed for a month for rescheduling after Tobago United were expelled from the league on 16 September 2010, leaving ten teams. Furthermore, after the season had been concluded, Ma Pau requested a one-year sabbatical from the Pro League from the 2011–12 season. On 10 August 2011, Skeene further announced that both Joe Public and FC South End would not be participating in the following season. After having won its first ten matches of the season, Defence Force clinched their second season title on 18 January 2011. By finishing as the league champion, Defence Force qualified for the 2011 CFU Club Championship. Caledonia AIA also qualified for the regional competition by finishing runners-up in the league.

Changes from the 2009 season 
The following changes were made since the 2009 season:

 Dexter Skeene, Pro League CEO, announced that league matches would only be played on Fridays and Saturdays, with the season ending on 1 February.
 The Pro League Big Six competition was discontinued to increase the importance of league matches.
 There were a number of changes to the clubs competing in the 2010–11 season.
 United Petrotrin withdrew from the league following the 2009 season.
 North East Stars were re-admitted after a one-year absence from the league.
 A two-year title sponsorship agreement was announced between North East Stars and DirecTV.
 Italian sportswear company, Lotto announced a uniform supplier agreement with North East Stars.
 T&TEC, the 2009 National Super League runners-up, requested that its application for admission into the Pro League be deferred until the 2011–12 season.

Teams

Team summaries 

Note: Flags indicate national team as has been defined under FIFA eligibility rules. Players may hold more than one non-FIFA nationality.

Player transfers

Managerial changes

League table

Positions by round

Results

Season statistics

Scoring 
 First goal of the season: Matthew Bartholomew for W Connection against San Juan Jabloteh, (23 April 2010).
 Last goal of the season: Sayid Freitas for Police against FC South End, (1 February 2011).
 First own goal of the season: Aubrey David (FC South End) for North East Stars, (20 November 2010).
 First penalty kick of the season: Matthew Bartholomew (scored) for W Connection against Joe Public (29 May 2010).
 First hat-trick of the season: Odelle Armstrong (St. Ann's Rangers) against Police, 53', 65', 89' (29 May 2010).
 Most goals scored by one player in a match: 3 goals
 Odelle Armstrong (St. Ann's Rangers) against Police, 53', 65', 89' (29 May 2010).
 Anthony Wolfe (North East Stars) against Police, 53', 66', 86' (7 December 2010).
 Kerry Baptiste (Joe Public) against San Juan Jabloteh, 51', 66', 87', (7 December 2010).
 Widest winning margin: 6 goals
 FC South End 0–6 W Connection (15 January 2011)
 Most goals in a match: 9 goals
 North East Stars 6–3 Police (7 December 2010)
 Most goals in one half: 7 goals
 Police v St. Ann's Rangers (29 May 2010) 0–0 at half-time, 2–5 final.
 Most goals in one half by a single team: 6 goals
 North East Stars v Police (7 December 2010) 0–3 at half-time, 6–3 final.

Top scorers

Hat-tricks 

 * Home team score first in result

Discipline 
 First yellow card of the season: Jason Marcano for San Juan Jabloteh against W Connection, (23 April 2010).
 First red card of the season: Nicholas Valentine for St. Ann's Rangers against Ma Pau, (30 April 2010).
 Most yellow cards in a single match: 8
 Joe Public 1–3 Defence Force – 3 for Joe Public (Makan Hislop & Andre Toussaint) and 5 for Defence Force (Devorn Jorsling, Kerry Joseph, Michael Edwards & Sean Narcis) (5 June 2010)
 Most red cards in a single match: 2
 Ma Pau 0–0 St. Ann's Rangers – 1 for Ma Pau (Keyeno Thomas) and 1 for St. Ann's Rangers (Nicholas Valentine)
 Caledonia AIA 1–2 FC South End – 1 for Caledonia AIA (Nuru Abdallah Muhammad) and 1 for FC South End (Jammeal Huyghue)
 Joe Public 1–3 Defence Force – 1 for Joe Public (Andre Toussaint) and 1 for Defence Force (Sean Narcis)

Awards

Annual awards 
The 2010–11 TT Pro League awards distribution took place on 8 April 2013, over two years after the conclusion of the league season, at Capital Plaza in Port of Spain, Trinidad.

After claiming the Pro League title for the second time and first since 1999, Defence Force was recognised as the Team of the Year. Devorn Jorsling was awarded the league's Player of the Year for the first time in his career. Jorsling also received the Golden Boot and Forward of the Year awards after leading the league with 15 goals in support of the Teteron Boys. Ross Russell was named the Manager of the Year after leading Defence Force to the league title in his second season. In addition, shot-stopper Cleon John of San Juan Jabloteh was named the league's Best Goalkeeper, Corneal Thomas of Ma Pau as the Defender of the Year, and Trent Noel was again named the Midfielder of the Year playing for Joe Public. The remaining team award was won by St. Ann's Rangers for the Most Disciplined Team of the Year. FIFA international referee, Neal Brizan, won the Referee of the Year for the fourth consecutive year, whereas Norris Ferguson won the Match Commissioner of the Year for the first time since 2007.

References

External links 
 Official Website
 Soca Warriors Online, TT Pro League

TT Pro League seasons
1
Trinidad